James Roger Madalena, Sr. (Jemez Pueblo, born October 31, 1948) is an American politician who served as a Democratic member of the New Mexico House of Representatives, representing District 65, from January 1985 to January 2017.

Education
Madalena earned his BA from Eastern New Mexico University.

Career 
After serving in the New Mexico House of Representatives for over 30 years, Madelena was succeeded in 2016 by attorney and businessman Derrick J. Lente. Madelena ran for his old seat in the 2020 election  but he lost in the primary 69% to 31%.

References

External links
Official page at the New Mexico Legislature

James Roger Madalena, Jr., Ballotpedia
James Roger Madalena at OpenSecrets

1948 births
Living people
Eastern New Mexico University alumni
Democratic Party members of the New Mexico House of Representatives
Native American state legislators in New Mexico
People from Sandoval County, New Mexico
21st-century American politicians